Haridwar Legislative Assembly constituency is one of the seventy electoral Uttarakhand Legislative Assembly constituencies of Uttarakhand state in India. It includes Haridwar City area.

Laksar Legislative Assembly constituency is a part of Haridwar (Lok Sabha constituency).

Members of Legislative Assembly

Election results

2022

References

External links
  

 http://www.empoweringindia.org/new/searching.aspx?value=Hardwar&type=2

Haridwar
Assembly constituencies of Uttarakhand